Anolis rodriguezii, the Middle American smooth anole or Rodriguez's anole, is a species of lizard in the family Dactyloidae. The species is found in Mexico, Guatemala, Honduras, and Belize.

References

Anoles
Reptiles described in 1873
Reptiles of Mexico
Reptiles of Guatemala
Reptiles of Honduras
Reptiles of Belize
Taxa named by Marie Firmin Bocourt